Mackenzie West is a former territorial electoral district, that elected Members to the Northwest Territories Legislative Assembly in Canada.

The electoral district historically covered the communities of, Fort Liard, Fort Simpson, Fort Wrigley, Fort Norman, Fort Franklin, Norman Wells, Fort Good Hope, Arctic Red River, Aklavik, Reindeer Depot and Tuktoyaktuk.

The electoral district was abolished on July 15, 1954.

1951 election

References

Former electoral districts of Northwest Territories